Ingar Nielsen (29 August 1885 – 21 January 1963) was a Norwegian sailor who competed in the 1920 Summer Olympics and in the 1924 Summer Olympics. In 1920 he was a crew member of the Norwegian boat Eleda, which won the gold medal in the 10 metre class (1907 rating). Four years later he won his second gold medal in the 8 metre class.

References

External links
profile

1885 births
1963 deaths
Norwegian male sailors (sport)
Sailors at the 1920 Summer Olympics – 10 Metre
Sailors at the 1924 Summer Olympics – 8 Metre
Olympic sailors of Norway
Olympic gold medalists for Norway
Olympic medalists in sailing
Medalists at the 1924 Summer Olympics
Medalists at the 1920 Summer Olympics